Carolan may refer to:

Places
 Carolan, Arkansas

People
 Turlough O'Carolan (1670–1738), Irish harper and composer
 Carolan (surname)

Food and drink
 Carolans, a liqueur based on Irish whiskey

See also

Carol Ann